NTU Music Express is an annual non-profit Chinese Song Composing Competition organized by Nanyang Technological University (NTU) Chinese Society. Up till now, it has been held for twenty-two years consecutively.

In the past few years, "Music Express" has explored and stimulated the creative potential of many students, and become a platform for NTU students to show their talent. The aim of "Music Express" is to encourage people to participate in the Chinese song writing and express their feelings, views and thoughts.

"Music Express" was originally a non-competitive activity; the majority of participants are NTU students. Now, the competition is opened to any students, residents and citizens in Singapore and Malaysia who are below 35 years old and students above 12. Original songs will be given some comments by professional judges. Eight groups of finalists will be invited to participate in roadshow and workshop section.

History 
Previously, Music Express competitions were mainly focusing on Singapore tertiary institution students.

From the 12th to 18th, “Music Express” was divided into two groups which are group A, songwriting (contestants must compose the rhythm and lyric), and group B, lyric writing (contestants must fill in the lyric in the song provided by the organizer). Even though Group B is eliminated in the 19th Music Express, it was divided into Student Group and Public Group. However, Student Group was eliminated in the 20th Music Express. Despite this, Music Express has held its own event roadshows to the public outside NTU in 21st and 22nd Music Express. At the same time, the competition was promoted to Malaysia.

In the "Music Express" of previous years, Singapore's famous songwriters such as Ms Naomi, Mr. Wang Rui Qi, Ms. Xing Zeng Hua, Mr. Liu Guo Ming, Mr. Xu Huan Liang, Mr. Goh Kheng Long, Mr. Eric Ng, Mr Derrick Tham, Ms. Xiaohan, Mr Hong Junyang, Mr. Jim Lim and Mr. Zhang Si Er were invited to be the guest of honor and judges of "Music Express". In addition, famous singers for instance Serene Kong, Ah Du, Zhang Feng Qi, Wu Jia Hui, Joi Chua, Kelvin Tan Wei Lian, Huang Yida, Soda Green and Ling Kai were invited as special guests as well. Singapore singers, Kelly Poon and Stella Seah, were also few of the performing guests who had performed in Music Express.

Previous Music Express-22nd Music Express 

The twenty two Music Express was held successfully in August 2016. The nationwide Chinese Song Composing competition focused on Singapore tertiary institution students, in return  numerous good entries were collected. Singapore renowned music recording companies, Touch Music Publishing Pte Ltd and Ocean Butterfly Music Pte Ltd are Music Express's official working partners.

Timeline

20th Music Express

22nd Music Express

23rd Music Express

Prizes

20th Music Express

21st Music Express

22nd Music Express

23rd Music Express

Past finalists and guest performers

References

Singaporean music
Nanyang Technological University